Big Audio Dynamite I & II is a compilation album by Big Audio Dynamite released in 2000 on the Sony Music Special Products label. It comprises tracks from the albums This is Big Audio Dynamite, No. 10, Upping St., Tighten Up Vol. 88, Megatop Phoenix and The Globe.

Track listing
"C'Mon Every Beatbox" - 5:25
"Rush" - 4:17
"A Party" - 6:40
"Mr. Walker Said" - 4:31
"The Battle of All Saints Road" - 5:13
"The Globe" - 6:06
"James Brown" - 5:08
"V. Thirteen" - 4:41
"Rock Non Stop (All Night Long)" - 3:38
"Tighten Up Vol. 88" - 4:04

The rear sleeve mistitles "The Battle of All Saints Road" as The Battle of All Saint Road.

Big Audio Dynamite albums
2000 compilation albums
Albums produced by Bill Price (record producer)